Ctenophion is a genus of the parasitic wasp family Ichneumonidae. It currently consists of only one species, Ctenophion niger, from the Nearctic.

The genus is larger than the usual Ichneumonidae wasp, with its body length ranging from 4 to 5.5 millimeters.

References

Ichneumonidae genera
Ichneumonidae
Monotypic Hymenoptera genera